Michigan's 6th congressional district is a United States congressional district in southeast Michigan. In 2022, the district was redrawn to be centered around Ann Arbor and Washtenaw County, as well as western and southern Wayne County, small part of southwestern Oakland County, and the city of Milan in Monroe County. In previous redistrictings, the 6th district consisted of all of Berrien, Cass, Kalamazoo, St. Joseph, and Van Buren, counties, and includes most of Allegan county.

The district is currently represented by Democrat Debbie Dingell, who previously represented the old 12th district.

Cities, Townships, and Villages

Cities

Villages

Townships

Voting

History
Michigan's sixth congressional district was originally formed in 1862.  At this time it had all the Upper Peninsula except Menominee, Delta and Mackinac counties.

The district was vaguely contiguous, in that it did not contain the Straits of Mackinac but did include Presque Isle County, which can be reached without going through another district's area.  It included another 21 counties on the Lower Peninsula.  The southern boundary of the district was formed by Clinton, Shiawassee, Genesee, Tuscola and Huron counties.  The district had a population of 97,783.

In 1872, the sixth district was shifted southward. It retained Clinton, Shiawassee, and Genesee counties while adding Ingham, Livingston and Oakland counties. With 163,000 residents the district had 12,000 more inhabitants than the next most populous district, and 65,000 more residents than Michigan's least populous district.

In 1882, Shiawassee County was removed from the district.  The new district had about 165,000 people.  In 1892, Clinton County was removed but the townships of Livonia, Nankin (now Westland, Michigan and surrounding cities), Redford (including the eastern portion since annexed by Detroit), Greenfield (almost all now in Detroit, except the portion that became Highland Park, Springwells (since annexed by Detroit and Dearborn), and Dearborn in Wayne County were added, as well as the part of Detroit west of Lawton.  This new district had a population of 190,539 that was 0.8% African-American.

No changes were made in the boundaries of the district in 1902. Its population had risen to 221,699.

It was not until 1932 that the boundaries of the 6th district were altered. In this year it lost its parts of Oakland and Wayne counties and was shifted to Ingham, Livingston, and Genesee Counties.  These boundaries were not changed until 1964, when the district was redrawn to cover Jackson, Ingham, and Shiawassee counties.

In 1972, the district was redrawn to include Jackson, Ingham, and Livingston counties, as well as the western portion of Washtenaw County.

In 1982 the district was redrawn to Ingham, Livingston, and northwestern Oakland counties with a finger stretching all the way to Pontiac.  Waterford Township was in the district, as was Auburn Hills, but Orion Township, Rochester Hills and Bloomfield Hills were all in other districts.  The boundaries also included Independence Township, White Lake Township, Rose Township, Springfield Township and Highland Township.  Brighton and the areas directly east of it in Livingston County were also not in this district.  Most of Lansing was put in the 3rd district.  In Jackson County the district covered Henrietta Township, Rives Township, and Tompkins Township.  In Clinton County it included Bath Township.  In Shiawassee County the district included Antrim Township, Perry Township, Perry, and Woodhull Township.

In 1992, most of the old 6th's territory became the 8th district, while the 6th was redrawn to cover most of the old 4th and a small portion of the old 3rd, ending the splitting of Kalamazoo County between two districts.  There were minor changes in the districts boundaries in 2002 and 2012.

List of representatives

Recent election results

2012

2014

2016

2018

2020

2022

Historical district boundaries

See also

Michigan's congressional districts
List of United States congressional districts

Notes

References
 Govtrack.us for the 7th District – Lists current Senators and representative, and map showing district outline
 The Political graveyard: U.S. Representatives from Michigan, 1807–2003
 U.S. Representatives 1837–2003, Michigan Manual 2003–2004

 Congressional Biographical Directory of the United States 1774–present

06
Constituencies established in 1863
1863 establishments in Michigan